St. Mark's Episcopal Church is a historic Episcopal church located at 204 S. King Street in Halifax, Halifax County, North Carolina. Built in 1855, it is a gable-front Carpenter Gothic style frame building. It has a steep gable roof, tall pyramidal spire, and board-and-batten siding.

It was listed on the National Register of Historic Places in 1998.

References

Episcopal church buildings in North Carolina
Churches on the National Register of Historic Places in North Carolina
Churches completed in 1855
Carpenter Gothic church buildings in North Carolina
National Register of Historic Places in Halifax County, North Carolina
19th-century Episcopal church buildings
Individually listed contributing properties to historic districts on the National Register in North Carolina
Churches in Halifax County, North Carolina
Buildings and structures in Halifax, North Carolina